Gerdah Belij (also Romanized as Gerdah Belīj; also known as Gerdah Belej and Gerdeh Balīch) is a village in Targavar Rural District, Silvaneh District, Urmia County, West Azerbaijan Province, Iran. At the 2006 census, its population was 141, in 24 families.

References 

Populated places in Urmia County